The name Phyllis has been used for twelve tropical cyclones in the Western Pacific Ocean.

Typhoon Phyllis (1953) (T5310, 11W)
Typhoon Phyllis (1958) (T5803)
Typhoon Phyllis (1960) (T6028, 31W)
Typhoon Phyllis (1963) (T6326, 41W, Sisang)
Tropical Storm Phyllis (1966) (T6609, 09W)
Typhoon Phyllis (1969) (T6901, 01W)
Typhoon Phyllis (1972) (T7206, 07W)
Typhoon Phyllis (1975) (T7505, 07W, Etang)
Typhoon Phyllis (1978) (T7825, 28W)
Tropical Storm Phyllis (1981) (T8110, 12W)
Typhoon Phyllis (1984) (T8418, 20W)
Typhoon Phyllis (1987) (T8724, 24W, Trining)

Pacific typhoon set index articles